Niccolò Corrado (born 19 March 2000) is an Italian professional footballer who plays as a left-back for  team Ternana.

Club career

Inter
He joined Inter youth teams in the summer of 2016 from Prato.

From the 2017–18 season he started to play for Inter's Under-19 squad.

Loan to Arezzo
On 21 August 2019, Corrado was loaned to Serie C club Arezzo on a season-long loan deal. Ten days later, on 31 August, he made his professional debut in Serie C for Arezzo in a 1–0 away defeat against Pianese, he was replaced by Samuele Sereni after 55 minutes. Three more weeks later, on 19 October, he played his first entire match for the club, a 1–1 home draw against Alessandria. On 25 November, Corrado scored his first professional goal in the 55th minute of a 3–1 home win over Novara. Corrado ended his season-long loan to Arezzo with 20 appearances, all as a starter, and 1 goal. Arezzo reach the play-off, however the club was elibimated by Robur Siena in the first round but he had not been called up for the match.

Loan to Palermo
On 3 September 2020, Corrado was loaned to Serie C club Palermo on a season-long loan deal. Three weeks later, on 27 September, he made his debut for the club as a substitute replacing Roberto Crivello in the 63rd minute of a 2–0 away defeat against Teramo. On 9 November he played his first entire match for Palermo, a 1–1 home draw against Catania. Corrado ended his season-long loan to Palermo with only 7 appearances, 4 of them as a starter, all in the first part of the loan, during the season he remained an unused substitute 11 times. Corrado also helped the club to reach the play-off, however Palermo was eliminated by Avellino 1–1 on aggregate in the round of 16, he remained on the bench for both matches.

Loan to FeralpiSalò 
On 21 July 2021, Corrado was signed by Serie C side FeralpiSalò on a season-long loan deal.

Ternana
On 5 July 2022, Corrado joined Ternana on a permanent deal.

International career
He was first called up to represent his country in 2016 for Under-17 squad friendlies.

He was selected for the 2019 UEFA European Under-19 Championship squad and made two late substitute appearances as Italy was eliminated at group stage.

Career statistics

Club

Honours

Club 
Inter Primavera
 Campionato Primavera 1: 2017–18
 Supercoppa Primavera: 2018
 Torneo di Viareggio: 2018

References

External links
 

2000 births
Living people
Footballers from Florence
Italian footballers
Association football defenders
Serie B players
Serie C players
Inter Milan players
S.S. Arezzo players
Palermo F.C. players
FeralpiSalò players
Ternana Calcio players
Italy youth international footballers